Chasseur, may refer to:

Military
 Chasseur, French term for a type of light infantry and the regiments of such infantry
 , French destroyers of the early 20th century
 , lead ship of the eponymous class
 , a Baltimore clipper commanded by Captain Thomas Boyle, one of the most famous American privateers
 Brooklyn Chasseurs, an American Civil War unit
 Chasseur was the French term for pursuit aircraft, i.e. fighter aircraft

People
 Catharina de Chasseur (1490–1541), Dutch counterfeiter
 Blanchette Chasseur (1739–1793), French-Canadian explorer

Other uses
 Le Chasseur, a brand of French cast iron cookware
 Chasseur (sauce), a French brown sauce
 A chasseur cap is another name for a kepi, which is a cap with a flat, round top and a stiff visor

See also

 Petit Chasseur, Sion, Valais, Switzerland; a street
 Le Petit-Chasseur, Sion, Valais, Switzerland; a megalithic site
 
 Hunter (disambiguation)
 Huntress (disambiguation)
 Huntsman (disambiguation)